Jessica Ashley Karpov (born July 10, 1992), better known as Harloe (stylized in all caps), is an American singer and songwriter, based in Los Angeles. In addition to her career as a recording artist, Karpov co-wrote and co-produced four songs on Kelly Clarkson's 2017 album Meaning of Life, including the singles "I Don't Think About You" and "Heat". She has also written for Britney Spears, Charli XCX, Celine Dion, Zayn, K/DA, Sabrina Claudio, and Olivia Holt.

Early life
Born in Queens, New York, Harloe is the child of Laura and Igor Karpov, and is of Russian and Romanian descent. Her sister, Suzanne, is an opera singer. She graduated from Lynbrook Senior High School in Lynbrook, New York in 2010 and attended performing arts school at NYU Clive Davis School of Recorded Music in New York City.

Career

As HARLOE (2016–present)
In 2016, she released her first single as Harloe, "All in My Feelings," featuring Dreezy. In 2017 she released the single "More Than Ever". In 2018, She Co-Wrote and Produced, "K/DA's" first Single "POP/STARS", for "Riot Games", "League Of Legends", with Sebastien Najand, Lydia Paek, and Minji Kim. In 2019 she wrote for, and was featured on Robin Schulz's single "All This Love". In 2019, Harloe began releasing music through Roc Nation. She released the single and music video for "Rivers Run Dry" on 1 October 2019. On 19 November 2019, she released the single and music video for "One More Chance". Her debut EP as Harloe, also titled Rivers Run Dry, was released in spring 2020.

Also in 2019, she provided the singing voice of Flora in the anime television series Carole & Tuesday.

As Jessica Ashley (2009–2015)
She has been performing, singing and dancing, publicly since 2009. In 2016, she released her first single as Harlœ, All in My Feelings. In 2012, she released an EP as Jessica Ashley, Prelude, featuring the singles "Souvenir", "24 Hours" and "Neverland". The video for "Neverland" starred actor Justin Gaston, with Ashley taking on the role of a contemporary Cinderella. In 2014, she signed a record deal with Epic Records.

Discography

EPs

Singles

Guest appearances

Songwriting discography

References

1992 births
American contemporary R&B singers
American people of Russian descent
American people of Romanian descent
Living people
People from Queens, New York
People from Lynbrook, New York
21st-century American women singers
Lynbrook Senior High School alumni
Roc Nation artists
21st-century American singers